The men's 4x400 metres relay event  at the 2001 IAAF World Indoor Championships was held on March 10–11.

Medalists

* Runners who participated in the heats only and received medals.

Note: The United States originally won the silver medal, but were disqualified after Jerome Young admitted to the use of banned substances.

Results

Heats
Qualification: First 2 teams of each heat (Q) and the next 2 fastest (q) advance to the final.

Final

References
Results

400
4 × 400 metres relay at the World Athletics Indoor Championships